This is a list of Turkish Grand Mosques or Ulucami, a title originally given to the grandest Friday mosque of a Turkish city where local citizens traditionally gathered en masse for Friday Prayers, though today it is common for Muslims in a single city to gather in several different mosques for these prayers.


Turkish Grand Mosques

See also
List of mosques in Turkey
List of mosques in Istanbul
List of mosques in Europe
List of mosques in Asia
Lists of mosques
Islam in Turkey

Notes

References

Lists of religious buildings and structures in Turkey
 
Grand mosques